Olga Dudko is a Ukrainian physicist who is a professor at the University of California, San Diego. Her research makes use of theoretical physics to understand complex biological problems. She was elected Fellow of the American Physical Society in 2022.

Early life and education 
Dudko completed undergraduate and postgraduate research at the National University of Kharkiv, where she worked in condensed matter physics. She moved to Tel Aviv University as a postdoctoral fellow, where she worked alongside Joseph Klafter on dynamic force spectroscopy. Dudko eventually left Israel for the National Institutes of Health.

Research and career 
Dudko joined the University of California, San Diego in 2007. She uses physics-based approaches to understand biological systems. In partnership with Attila Szabo and Gerhard Hummer, Dudko devised the Dudko-Hummer-Szabo theory to describe the kinetic behaviour of macromolecules in dynamic force experiments. She was awarded an National Science Foundation CAREER Award and a Hellman Fellowship to investigate single molecule biophysics. By translating the physics developed to understand the phase transitions of polymers to biological systems, Dudko explained the organizational processes that take place within the nuclei of living cells. She developed a theoretical description of synaptic transmission, that showed that chemical synapses had similar behavior irrespective of their size or rate of neurotransmitter release.

Dudko became associate editor of Physical Review Letters in 2019. In 2022, she was named a Simons Foundation Investigator, and elected a Fellow of the American Physical Society.

Selected publications

References 

Living people
National University of Kharkiv alumni
Fellows of the American Physical Society
University of California, San Diego faculty
Ukrainian emigrants to the United States
21st-century American physicists
American women physicists
Year of birth missing (living people)